The Malaysian Basketball Association (MABA) Stadium (Malay: Stadium Bola Keranjang Malaysia) is an indoor arena in Kuala Lumpur, Malaysia. It is the main venue of the Malaysian Basketball Association, the national basketball federation for basketball in Malaysia.

The MABA Stadium was built in 1995 at the cost of RM13.5 million. It has a capacity to accommodate 1,800 people. The venue was renovated in 2017 for the 29th Southeast Asian Games.

References

Buildings and structures in Kuala Lumpur
Indoor arenas in Malaysia
Buildings and structures completed in 1995
Sports venues completed in 1995
Basketball venues in Malaysia
20th-century architecture in Malaysia